Willie Magee (1884 – 26 October 1945) was a British cyclist. He competed in three events at the 1908 Summer Olympics.

References

External links
 

1884 births
1945 deaths
British male cyclists
Olympic cyclists of Great Britain
Cyclists at the 1908 Summer Olympics
Place of birth missing